Gratia (minor planet designation: 424 Gratia) is a large Main belt asteroid.

It was discovered by Auguste Charlois on 31 December 1896 in Nice.
It was named after the Gratiae from Greek mythology.

References

External links
 
 

Background asteroids
Gratia
18961231
Gratia